Julio J. Casal (18 June 1889 Montevideo – 7 December 1954) was an Uruguayan poet and critic.

Casal was the founder of the literary magazine Alfar. He edited the poetry anthology Exposición de la poesía uruguaya.

Casal died in 1954. His daughter Selva Casal is also a renowned poet.

Works
 Regrets (poesía), Madrid, 1910.
 Allá lejos (poesía), Madrid, 1912.
 Cielos y llanuras (poesía), Madrid, 1914.
 Nuevos Horizontes (poesía), Madrid, 1916.
 Huerto maternal (poesía), Madrid, 1919.
 Humildad (poesía), Madrid, 1921.
 56 poemas (poesía), Madrid, 1921.
 Árbol (poesía), La Coruña, 1925.
 Colina de la música (poesía), Montevideo, 1933.
 Exposición de la poesía uruguaya desde sus orígenes hasta 1940 (antología), Montevideo, Claridad, 1940.
 Cuaderno de otoño (poesía), Buenos Aires, Losada, 1947.
 Recuerdo de cielo (poesía), Montevideo, 1949.
 Rafael Barradas (ensayo), Buenos Aires, Losada, 1949.
 Distante álamo (poesía), Montevideo, 1956.
 Poesía, Montevideo, Aquí Poesía, 1964.
 Antología de prosa y poesía, Montevideo, 1966.

References

1889 births
1954 deaths
20th-century Uruguayan poets
Uruguayan male poets
Uruguayan literary critics
Writers from Montevideo
20th-century Uruguayan male writers